The 1943 Miami Redskins football team was an American football team that represented Miami University as an independent during the 1943 college football season. In its second and final season under head coach Stu Holcomb, Miami compiled a 7–2–1 record and outscored all opponents by a combined total of 293 to 91. The team lost to Western Michigan (6–0) and Arkansas A&M (35–0) and played Indiana to a 7–7 tie.  Bob Russell was the honorary team captain.

Schedule

References

Miami
Miami RedHawks football seasons
Miami Redskins football